Ernie Tweeddale (23 August 1895 – 28 May 1956) was an Australian cricketer. He played three first-class matches for New South Wales in 1925/26.

See also
 List of New South Wales representative cricketers

References

External links
 

1895 births
1956 deaths
Australian cricketers
New South Wales cricketers
Cricketers from Sydney